City Tower is a skyscraper in downtown San Antonio, in the U.S. state of Texas. The 22-story building previously served as the headquarters for Frost Bank from 1975 to 2019 until Frost Bank moved into the eponymously named Frost Tower.

In 2015 the city of San Antonio acquired the building for $52.9 million and has allotted $88 million for renovations to the building. Upon completion of the renovations the building will consolidate 24 city departments and 1,400 city employees and will serve as the main office building for the city of San Antonio.

See also
List of tallest buildings in San Antonio

References

Skyscraper office buildings in San Antonio
Office buildings completed in 1975